You the Rock (stylized as YOU THE ROCK★; born ; 5 September 1971, in Nagano, Nagano) is a Japanese hip-hop musician, MC and tarento.

Discography

Albums

Singles

Analogue

Main guest appearances

Music videos

Major casting works

TV dramas

Variety programmes

Radio

Advertisements

Advertisement narrations

Main live

See also
MTV

References

Notes

External links 
 You the Rock at Oricon  

Japanese hip hop musicians
1971 births
Living people
Musicians from Nagano Prefecture
Ki/oon Music artists
21st-century Japanese singers
21st-century Japanese male singers